Charles Ambrose Johnson (born 5 May 1934), also known as Mickey Johnson, is a Bermudian diver. He competed in the men's 3 metre springboard event at the 1952 Summer Olympics.

References

External links
 
 

1934 births
Living people
Bermudian male divers
Olympic divers of Bermuda
Divers at the 1952 Summer Olympics
Place of birth missing (living people)